Sunu may refer to:
Sunu, Iran, a village in South Khorasan Province
Gilles Sunu, French footballer of Togolese descent
Manu Sunu, Togolese footballer
Sastha Sunu, Indonesian film editor
Party for Solidarity and Development of Senegal – Sunu Party
Sunü, the divine sister of the Chinese war and sex goddess Jiutian Xuannü